Dogspot is India's biggest online platform for dogs, cats, birds, fish and some small pets. It is also the leading online store for pet supplies, food, accessories and other products.

History 
Dogspot was founded in 2007 by Rana Atheya. It is the biggest online platform for pets in India. It sells Pedigree, Royal Canin, Eukanoba, Hill's, Whiskas and many other brands.

In Jan 2016, Ratan Tata invested in Dosgpot. Existing investors, Ronnie Screwala also participated in the round. Dogspot had earlier, raised funding from India Quotient, K Ganesh and Ronnie Screwala in 2014.

Product lines

Dog products 
Dogspot owns Nibbles. DogSpot also sells Purina Dog Food and its Supercoat blends.

References

External links 
 Dogspot

Retail companies established in 2007
Internet properties established in 2007
Pet stores
2007 establishments in Haryana
petsfoodspro
why socialization is so important